Gujranwala Medical College is situated at Alipur Chatha Road Gujranwala, in the Province of Punjab, Pakistan. The college is the constituent college of the University of Health Sciences. Divisional Headquarter/Teaching Hospital Gujranwala is the attached hospital for this Medical College.

Departments
GMC includes the following departments:

 Department of Anatomy
 Department of Physiology
 Department of Biochemistry
 Department of Pharmacology
 Department of Pathology
 Department of Community & Public Health Sciences
 Department of Forensic Medicine & Toxicology
 Department of Information Technology 
 Department of Medicine
 Department of Surgery
 Department of Obstetrics and Gynecology
 Department of ENT
 Department of Ophthalmology
 Department of Pediatrics
 Department of Psychiatry
 Department of Medical Education

https://www.facebook.com/gmcgujranwala/?fref=ts

Faculty & Students Gujranwala Medical College

http://www.digitallibrary.edu.pk/gujran.html

https://sites.google.com/site/gmccompkelibrary/

See also
List of schools of medicine in Pakistan

References

Medical colleges in Punjab, Pakistan
Gujranwala